P'arang Geri Larkin, born Geraldine Kapp Willis, is founder and former head teacher of Still Point Zen Buddhist Temple, a Korean Chogye center in Detroit, Michigan. The name Geri Larkin is a pen name. She graduated from Barnard College in 1973. Larkin, daughter of a wealthy IBM executive, left her successful business life as a management consultant to enter a Buddhist seminary for three years, where she was ordained. When she left she sold her material possessions and bought a brick duplex in downtown Detroit which, with the help of local residents she cleaned up and turned into Still Point. Larkin's articulation of the concept of "right livelihood" was highly influential on Ann Perrault and Jackie Victor, two of her students who founded Avalon International Breads in Detroit in 1997. She has been a longtime columnist for Spirituality & Health magazine.

She currently resides in Eugene, Oregon.

Bibliography

Books

Building a Business the Buddhist Way 
Tap Dancing in Zen 
First You Shave Your Head 
The Still Point Dhammapada: Living the Buddha's Essential Teachings 
The Chocolate Cake Sutra 
Plant Seed, Pull Weed 
Love Dharma

Articles

See also
Timeline of Zen Buddhism in the United States

References

1950 births
Living people
Chogye Buddhists
Seon Buddhist monks
Zen Buddhism writers
American Zen Buddhists
Female Buddhist spiritual teachers
20th-century pseudonymous writers
21st-century pseudonymous writers
Pseudonymous women writers
Barnard College alumni